Kuramosciadium is a genus of flowering plants belonging to the family Apiaceae.

Its native range is Central Asia.

Species:
 Kuramosciadium corydalifolium Pimenov, Kljuykov & Tojibaev

References

Apiaceae
Apiaceae genera